Bagherpara Pilot High School is situated in Bagherpara Upazila, Jessore District, Bangladesh. This school was established in 1958. More than 4,000 students do study every year. This is the main center for the S.S.C exam. It's covering the end of Narail and Magura District boundaries.

References

 https://web.archive.org/web/20090517222922/http://www.educationboard.gov.bd/jessore/index.php
 Bangladesh Land Record Ministry.

Educational institutions established in 1958
High schools in Bangladesh
1958 establishments in East Pakistan